Plyushchevo is a rural locality (a village) in Novlenskoye Rural Settlement, Vologodsky District, Vologda Oblast, Russia. The population was 12 as of 2002.

Geography 
Plyushchevo is located 64 km northwest of Vologda (the district's administrative centre) by road. Podolets is the nearest rural locality.

References 

Rural localities in Vologodsky District